Bryon Donald Baltimore  (born August 26, 1952) is a Canadian former professional ice hockey player, who played in the NHL and WHA.

Baltimore started his hockey career playing two seasons for the University of Alberta. He then joined the AHL's Springfield Kings. He was called up by the Los Angeles Kings for the 1974 playoffs but he did not see any ice time. In 1974, he signed with the Chicago Cougars of the WHA, and he played in the WHA until it folded. In the ensuing dispersal draft, he was picked up by the Edmonton Oilers, with whom he played two games in the 1979–80 season. Baltimore is one of only two Yukon-raised players to participate in an NHL game, the other being Jarrett Deuling. 

After his hockey career ended, Baltimore became a litigation lawyer in Edmonton, Alberta, practicing at McCuaig Desrochers LLP where he serves as managing partner. Baltimore coached the now defunct Montana Magic in 1983-84 in the CHL. Team had 20/52/4 record. The league folded after this season.

Career statistics

Regular season and playoffs

References

External links 
 

1952 births
Living people
Alberta Golden Bears ice hockey players
Canadian ice hockey defencemen
Chicago Cougars players
Cincinnati Stingers players
Denver Spurs (WHA) players
Edmonton Oilers players
Houston Apollos players
Ice hockey people from Yukon
Indianapolis Racers players
Ottawa Civics players
Sportspeople from Whitehorse
Undrafted National Hockey League players
Wichita Wind players